Cepora fora is a butterfly in the family Pieridae. It is found on Sulawesi.

Subspecies
The following subspecies are recognised:
Cepora fora fora
Cepora fora milos Watanabe, 1987 (south-eastern Sulawesi)
Cepora fora papayatana Watanabe, 1987 (Sulawesi)

References

Pierini
Butterflies described in 1897
Butterflies of Indonesia
Taxa named by Hans Fruhstorfer